Charles Caldwell may refer to:

Charles Caldwell (bluesman) (1943–2003), American blues musician
Charles Caldwell (physician) (1772–1853), American physician, founder University of Louisville School of Medicine
Charles Caldwell (politician) (died 1875), political leader in Reconstruction-era Mississippi
Charles Henry Bromedge Caldwell (1823–1877), United States Navy officer during the American Civil War
C. Pope Caldwell (1875–1940), American politician from the state of New York
Charlie Caldwell (1901–1957), American baseball pitcher and football coach